Kenton is a surname. Notable people with the surname include:

Darren Kenton (born 1978), English footballer
Erle C. Kenton (1896–1980), American film director
Lou Kenton (1908–2012), English proofreader and centenarian
Rodrigo Kenton (born 1955), Costa Rican football coach
Simon Kenton (1755–1836), American pioneer and soldier
Stan Kenton (1911–1979), American jazz musician